Elections to Surrey County Council were held on Thursday, 5 May 1977.  The whole council of 73 members was up for election and the result was that the Conservatives comfortably retained their control, winning 68 seats, gaining ten from Labour, nine from the Liberals (who lost all their seats), and two from Independents. Labour ended with only two county councillors and the Independents with three, including one who stood as a "Resident" and another who stood as a "Ratepayer".

Election result

|}

Notes

1977
1977 English local elections
1970s in Surrey